Brandenburg Township is a civil township located in Richland County, North Dakota, United States. Its population during the 2000 Census was 142, and estimated to be 126 as of 2009.

History
Brandenburg Township was first settled in the mid-1870s by German immigrants, who originally named it Berlin.

The original name came from George Worner (1855 – 1950), an early settler, who in 1875 established a rural post office on his homestead, and named it Berlin in honor of Berlin, Germany. Worner was born in Germany, and his family emigrated to the United States, settling in Wisconsin before moving to Dakota Territory around 1874. The Berlin post office was later moved in 1882 to a site near present-day Great Bend, North Dakota, and was closed permanently on July 12, 1883. Part of Great Bend was platted on Worner's homestead, and he instrumental in the city's development. Worner later served as county commissioner and in the North Dakota House of Representatives from 1925 to 1932.

The township had been renamed Brandenburg by the time the 1890 Census was conducted. It reached a peak population of 552 people in 1900. Much of that population was absorbed into the city of Great Bend when it was incorporated in 1908 and became independent of the township.

Demographics 
The 2000 Census reported 142 people, 44 households, and 31 families in the township. The racial makeup of the city was 98.6% White, with 1.4% of the population reporting two or more races. Those that reported having German ancestry were nearly 80% of the population, reflecting the influence early German settlers had on the township.

Of the township's 44 households, 47.7% had children under the age of 18 living with them. 63.6% of households were made up of married couples living together, and 29.5% were non-family households. The average household size was 3.23 and the average family size was 4.06.

Brandenburg has a relatively young population, with a median age of 29.5 years. Roughly 73% of the population under the age of 45 in the year 2000. Those under the age of 18 made up the largest subsection of the population (43.7%), followed by 25- to 44-year-olds (29.6%) and 45- to 64-year-olds (16.2%). Just 6.3% of the population was over the age of 65.

The median income for a household in the city was $51,458, and the median income for a family was $51,667. Males had a median income of $37,188 versus $20,000 for females. The per capita income for the city was $20,330. About 6.0% of families and 7.0% of the population were below the poverty line, including 10.6% of those under the age of eighteen and none of those sixty five or over.

References

External links
 Map of Brandenburg Township during the 2000 Census

Townships in Richland County, North Dakota
Populated places established in the 1870s
Townships in North Dakota